John Saxon Barton  (13 April 1875 – 2 September 1961) was a New Zealand accountant, writer, lawyer, magistrate and public administrator. He was born in Richmond, Victoria, Australia on 13 April 1875. He was one of the two commissioners put in charge of rebuilding Napier after the 1931 Hawke's Bay earthquake. In the 1933 King's Birthday Honours, Barton was appointed a Companion of the Order of St Michael and St George (CMG) for public services in Napier.

In 1935, he was awarded the King George V Silver Jubilee Medal.

References

1875 births
1961 deaths
20th-century New Zealand judges
District Court of New Zealand judges
Australian emigrants to New Zealand
New Zealand writers
New Zealand Companions of the Order of St Michael and St George
People from Richmond, Victoria